Bakhsh Zirdu (also Romanized as Bakhsh Zīrdū; also known as Bakhs, Bakhs Zīrdu, Dehbaj, Deh Baj-e Bakhs, Zīrdow, Zīrdow Bakhs, and Zīrdu) is a village in Rostam-e Yek Rural District, in the Central District of Rostam County, Fars Province, Iran. At the 2006 census, its population was 192, in 43 families.

References 

Populated places in Rostam County